Karaftu District is a district (bakhsh) in Divandarreh County, Kurdistan Province, Iran. At the 2006 census, its population was 18,938, in 3,795 families.  The District has one city: Zarrineh. The District has three rural districts (dehestan): Kani Shirin Rural District, Obatu Rural District, and Zarrineh Rural District.

References 

Divandarreh County
Districts of Kurdistan Province